Andre' Ledarryl Murray, better known by the stage name Dre Murray, (born September 14, 1981) is an American hip hop artist born and raised in Houston, Texas. He is a member of the rap collective We Live As Kings (W.L.A.K.).

Biography
Murray was born Andre' Ledarryl Murray on September 14, 1981, in Houston, Texas, to Andrew Lee Murray and Marjorie Ann Murray (née, Jones). He currently lives in Oklahoma with his wife and three children.

In 2008, Murray released his first album entitled Manumit. Between 2009 and 2011, Murray along with Wit created a series entitled Hell's Paradise. In 2012, Dre Murray signed to Collision Records, and became part of the Christian hip hop collective W.L.A.K. In 2013, Murray released his second studio album, Gold Rush: Maybe One Day, with Collision Records.

He released, Southern Lights: Overexposed, with Alex Faith on April 28, 2015 by Collision Records as well as "Southern Lights Remix" also with Alex Faith and was produced by Cardec Drums and features John Givez, JGivens, Corey Paul and Tragic Hero and sampled "Lights" by Ellie Goulding.

Discography
Studio albums

References

External links
 

1981 births
Living people
African-American male rappers
African-American Christians
American evangelicals
American performers of Christian hip hop music
Rappers from Houston
21st-century American rappers
21st-century American male musicians
21st-century African-American musicians
20th-century African-American people